Gennady Yakovlevich Shipulin (born in Belgorod on 29 April 1954) is a Russian volleyball coach, president and chief coach (from the early 1990s up to April 29, 2018)  of  VC Belogorie, Vice-President of the Russian Volleyball Federation. . Candidate of pedagogical sciences (2002).

Since 1998 to 2004, Gennady Shipulin led the team in Russia.

References

External links 
 Biography of Gennady Shipulin 
 Gennady  Yakovlevich Shipulin 
 Gennady Shipulin. Russiavolley.com

Russian volleyball coaches
People from Belgorod
1954 births
Living people
Recipients of the Order "For Merit to the Fatherland", 2nd class
Coaches of Russia men's national volleyball team
Honoured Coaches of Russia
Sportspeople from Belgorod Oblast